Talise is a Southeast Solomonic language native to Guadalcanal with a speaker population of roughly 13,000. While some consider Talise to be its own language, others use it as a blanket term to group the closely related dialects of Poleo, Koo, Malagheti, Moli, and Tolo. It is a branch of the Proto-Guadalcanal family, which forms part of the Southeast Solomons language group.

Name
The name Talise refers to the name of a tree called Terminalia catappa. It descends from Proto-Oceanic *talise, from Proto-Malayo-Polynesian *talisay of the same meaning (see Talisay).

Dialects
Even though Talise is a language on its own, it is also widely considered as a way to group other similar dialects such as Tolo, Moli, and Koo. The sound correspondences among these are very close. Many words like  'sun' and  'moon' are identical across all of the dialects. However, many other languages and dialects in Guadalcanal also share the same phonemes and words.

Phonology

Consonants 
The Tolo language has thirteen consonants. Most letters are pronounced as they are in English, with a few notable exceptions. The letter  may be pronounced as the voiced fricative  (as in English vote), but it is also pronounced as the glide  (as in English win) in certain cases.

Vowels 
Tolo has five short vowels, namely /a e i o u/. The letter e can either be pronounced as [ɛ] or as [e], and the letter i can either be pronounced as [ɪ] or as [i].

Diphthongs
There are eight diphthongs in the Tolo language. These are presented in the table below.

Prenasalisation
The nasal sounds [m], [n] and [ng] are no separate phonemes, but always occur before the phonemes /b/, /d/ and /g/ respectively. Therefore, they are to be understood as part of those latter sounds. However, the extent to which someone hears this prenasalisation depends entirely on the speaker, as some stress it more if /b/,/d/ or /g/ come at the middle of a word instead of at the beginning.

Stress
Stress in Tolo is almost always put on the second to last syllable, regardless of how many syllables are present in a word.

Grammar

Adjectives
Adjectives in Tolo almost always immediately follow the noun that they modify. The only exception to this rule is that numerals precede the noun. An example of this pattern is  'big child', where the adjective  'big' modifies the noun  'child'.

Possessive adjectives
The prefix/suffix 'na' is used to denote possession, depending on alienability, that is, if the modified noun is understood as an important part of the possessor or not. However, there is no specific rule that can be used to determine whether or not a noun is alienable or inalienable, so it is left up to each individual speaker.

Adverbs
Adverbs tend to come after the verb that they are modifying, but they come before the verb when they describe a direction. For example, in  'He went yesterday', the time adverb  'yesterday' modifies the verb  'went'. However, there are exceptions to both these rules. For example, to say come 'come quickly', one can say , using the adverb  after the verb , but if one uses the alternative adverb  to mean 'quickly', only the order  is acceptable.

Prepositions
These prepositions can also change their endings as the object they are describing changes.

Verbs 
Tolo verbs are divided into transitive and intransitive classes. Transitive verbs are followed by an object and change their endings depending on the object. Intransitive verbs are not followed by any objects and do not change their endings.

Passive voice
There is no passive voice in Tolo. English passive voice can be implied by using  'someone' or  'they' along with an active verb. For example,  can be translated to 'Bob's dog was stolen', but more literally means 'They stole Bob's dog.'

Future tense
Future tense is denoted by a pre-verbal particle. Future tense always has to indicated overtly, regardless of how far into the future the sentence talks about, whether it be a few minutes or a few months.

Plural nouns
Tolo marks plurality on the article, but not on the noun itself (as in English with the suffix -s). For example, the plural of  'the woman' is  'the women'.

Negative questions
Negative questions are commonly answered according to the sense of the question being asked, not necessarily according to the answer. This is unlike English, where a question like 'Don't you want it?' can be answered either with 'Yes, I want it' or 'No, I don't want it'. In this case, an answer is given based on the idea the question is posing, not necessarily on the way it is worded.

References

Gela-Guadalcanal languages
Languages of the Solomon Islands